Daud Public School And College (DPSC) is located Jessore Cantonment, Jessore, Bangladesh. This institute is run by Jessore Cantonment Board, under the Directorate of Military Lands and Cantonment, Government of the People's Republic of Bangladesh. The school is situated in the center of Jessore Cantonment, situated on 18.71 acres of land. The institute was founded by Dawood Khan, an industrialist of greater Jessore.

History 

On 3 September 1959 the foundation was laid. The building was built with the funding by the Messrs Dawood Group of Industries, at a cost of six and a half million rupees, hence it was named Dawood Public School after the name of the donor Dawood Khan.

The first class started on 17 June 1961. Prior to independence, this  institution was an English medium school and equivalent to the public schools of the then West Pakistan. In early 1959, the initial decision of founding the school was taken. Later on, was made into reality with help of the funding from Dawood Khan. An abandoned go-down used by British airbase during Second World War was selected as the location for the school. Initially, the journey started with 1 office room and 2 classroom rooms. At that time, curriculum prepared by Cambridge University were followed till the eighth grade.

Separation of Nursery And KG section

In the year 1995, the nursery and kindergarten classes were removed and started the journey as separate kindergarten named Poroshmoni Kindergarten (Presently known as Jessore International School)

Separation of College Section

In the year 1983, the college section was moved to new institute called Cantonment College. From that time to up until 2015 the school was known as Daud Public School as the college section was removed.

Reestablishment of the College Section

On 1 July 2015 the authority reestablished the college and it renamed back to its founding name Daud Public School And College. The Education Ministry approved the operation college section on 28 December 2014, and it was renamed back to its previous name on that day.

Curriculum 
  School Secondary Level SSC
Group — Science,& Business Studies
 Higher Secondary Level HSC
Group — Science, Humanities & Business Studies

Faculties 
The institution has three faculties of Science, Humanities and Business studies under the supervision of three separate Course Co-ordinators.

Faculty of Science 
  Department of Physics
  Department of Chemistry
  Department of Biology
  Department of Mathematics
  Department of Computer Science
  Department of Engineering and Drawing
  Department of Psychology
  Department of Ict

Faculty of (Arts)Humanities 
  Department of English
  Department of Bangla
  Department of Economics
  Department of Political Science
  Department of Geography
  Department of Islamic studies
  Department of Social Welfare
  Department of Logic
  Department of history

Faculty of(Commerce)Business Studies 
  Department of Accounting
  Department of Management
  Department of Economics & Commercial Geography
  Department of Office Management& Secretarial Science
  Department of Marketing
  Department of Finance & Banking

Clubs 
 BNCC
 Girl Guide
 Boy Scout
 Cultural 
 Red Crescent
 Computer
 Photography
 Math
 English
 Science
 Debate
 Sports

Campus 
Daud Public School And College is located at Jessore Cantonment.

Uniform

Results 
Source:

References

Educational institutions established in 1959
Schools in Jessore District
1959 establishments in East Pakistan
Colleges in Jashore District
Educational Institutions affiliated with Bangladesh Army